Nematopogon taiwanella is a moth of the Adelidae family or fairy longhorn moths. It was described by Mikhail Vasilievich Kozlov in 2001. This is a rather open, very old Abies kawakamii–Tsuga chinensis conifer woodland, with shrubby Rhododendron bushes and patches of pygmy bamboo.

The wingspan is 18–21 mm. The forewings are pale yellowish brown, but slightly darker at the costal margin. The hindwings are pale light yellowish grey, almost transparent.

References

Adelidae
Moths of Taiwan
Endemic fauna of Taiwan
Moths described in 2001